Rooba is an Estonian surname which may refer to:
Meelis Rooba (born 1977), Estonian footballer
Robert Rooba (born 1993), Estonian ice hockey player
Urmas Rooba (born 1978), Estonian footballer

Estonian-language surnames